The Kingdom of Aram-Damascus was an Aramean polity that existed from the late-12th century BCE until 732 BCE, and was centred around the city of Damascus in the Southern Levant. Alongside various tribal lands, it was bounded in its later years by the polities of Assyria to the north, Ammon to the south, and Israel to the west.

History
The Hebrew Bible gives accounts of Aram-Damascus' history, mainly in its interaction with Israel and Judah. There are biblical texts referencing battles that took place between the United Kingdom of Israel under David and the Arameans in Southern Syria in the 10th century BCE.

In the 9th century BCE, Hazael fought against the Assyrians, had some influence over the northern Syrian state of Unqi, and conquered Israel.

To the southwest, Aram-Damascus reached most of the Golan to the Sea of Galilee.

In the 8th century BCE, Rezin had been a tributary of Tiglath-Pileser III, a king of Assyria. In , he formed an alliance with Pekah, a king of Israel, to attack Ahaz, a king of Judah; Ahaz appealed to Tiglath-Pileser III for help, which was provided by the Assyrian king after Judah paid tribute. Subsequently, Tiglath-Pileser III attacked Damascus and annexed Aram. The kingdom's population was deported and Rezin was executed. Tiglath-Pileser III recorded this act in one of his inscriptions.

Kings

Ben-Hadad I, 885–865 BCE
Ben-Hadad II, 865–842 BCE
Hazael, 842–805/796 BCE
Ben-Hadad III, 796–792 BCE
Rezin, 754 BC–732 BCE

See also
Aram (region), a historical region in the Levant mentioned in the Bible
Aram-Naharaim, biblical term for the ancient land of the Arameans in Upper Mesopotamia
Aram Rehob, an early Aramean kingdom

References

Sources

 
 
 
 
 
 
 
 
 
 

States and territories established in the 12th century BC
States and territories disestablished in the 8th century BC
Aramean states
Ancient Syria
Ancient Damascus
History of Aram (region)
8th-century BC disestablishments
12th-century BC establishments
Former kingdoms